The 2010 European Cup was an international baseball competition among the top teams of the professional baseball leagues in Europe, held in the Czech Republic and the Netherlands from June 1 to 6, 2010.

Teams

Brno
The following 6 teams were qualified for the 2010 European Cup in Brno, Czech Republic.

Rotterdam
The following 6 teams were qualified for the 2010 European Cup in Rotterdam, Netherlands.

Standings

Brno

Rotterdam

References

External links
 Schedule in Brno
 Schedule in Rotterdam

European Cup
2010
2010
European Cup (baseball)